is an active volcano located in Daisetsuzan National Park, Hokkaidō, Japan. It is one of the 100 famous mountains in Japan.

There are four hiking trails to the peak of Tokachidake. Below is a hut, a campground and a natural hot spring (onsen).

See also
List of volcanoes in Japan
List of mountains in Japan

References

External links 
 Tokachidake - Japan Meteorological Agency 
 Tokachidake: National catalogue of the active volcanoes in Japan - Japan Meteorological Agency
 Tokachi Dake Volcano Group - Geological Survey of Japan
 

Stratovolcanoes of Japan
Active volcanoes
Volcanoes of Hokkaido
Mountains of Hokkaido
Biei, Hokkaido